Florida Gateway College (FGC), formerly Lake City Community College, is a public college in Lake City, Florida. It is part of the Florida College System and one of the institutions in the system designated a "state college", allowing it to offer four-year bachelor's degrees.

The institution was established in 1947 as the Columbia Forestry School and became a junior college in 1961. It adopted its current name in 2008. The school serves 7,000 students each year from its five-county district, which includes Baker, Columbia, Dixie, Gilchrist and Union counties.

History 
At the conclusion of World War II, the Lake City Naval Air Station was decommissioned and the Columbia Forestry School (CFS) was established in 1947, utilizing military structures that remained. At the time, Lake City claimed to be the "Forestry Capitol of the World". The first few years had extremely low enrollment and meager funding, causing the school's president to request help from the Florida Legislature. Instead of providing additional funding, the politicians directed the University of Florida to take over management of the school. Columbia Forestry School became the University of Florida Forest Ranger School in 1950.

Throughout the turbulent 1960s, the school had fewer than 400 students. In 1961, the school was invited to become one of 28 two-year educational facilities in the state's master plan for education as Lake City Junior College. Increased funding allowed wooden buildings to be replaced with brick structures after a fire burned several in 1963. However, a few of the WWII era buildings remained, though mostly unused, until the middle 1970s, when the last one was finally demolished. The "Junior" was dropped and the word, "Community" was placed in the college's name in 1970 to emphasize that the school offered occupational and cultural enrichment education for area residents.

Beginning in 2008, the Florida legislature began granting name changes to any of the 28 public community colleges that requested it. By removing community from their name, or substituting state, the college would be eligible to add bachelor's degree programs on a limited basis. On November 10, 2009, the LCCC Board of Trustees voted 8–1 to change the name of Lake City Community College to Florida Gateway College, effective July 1, 2010. This was the fifth name change in the college's history.

Campus 
FGC occupies  of natural pinelands, with over twenty-five buildings landscaped with native azalea bushes and crepe myrtle trees. Florida Leader Magazine designated LCCC as the most beautiful college campus in Florida.  FGC operates 3 satellite locations (Macclenny, Cross City & Bell) in the surrounding counties included in the college's service area. At these "storefront centers", local residents can attend live classes, take distance learning courses or talk to advisors via the internet and pick up brochures, catalogs, schedules, and forms.

After a ten-year hibernation, Granger Hall re-opened its doors in the fall of 2018 as the 84-student residence hall at Lake City Community College. It was one of only two community colleges to offer on-campus housing in Florida but was used predominately for students on athletic scholarship.

Organization and administration 
FGC is part of the Florida College System and its current president is Dr. Lawrence Barrett.

Academic profile 
A record 947 students graduated from Florida Gateway College in the 2017–2018 school year and enrollment to the college has shown steady growth, with the 2017-2018 year seeing a Headcount Enrollment of 4,958 of which 1,203 are Dual Enrollment students. The school has an open admissions policy for all programs except nursing, golf course operations and allied health programs.

The most popular fields of study are Criminal Justice, Public Safety & Fire Science, Corrections, Liberal Arts & Sciences, Nursing, Emergency Medical Technology .

Liberal arts and sciences 
The majority of students follow the track to earn an Associate of Arts degree for transfer to an upper division school in pursuit of a Bachelor's degree. Students are encouraged to select one of 44 majors with elective courses that will be accepted at their next educational institution.

Cosmetology 
Cosmetology is a one-year program (three semesters) which prepares students to pass the state of Florida examination to become a licensed cosmetologist. The program began in the mid-1960s, and enrolled a full class for more than twenty years, before struggling during the 1990s. The program was opened to students working full-time when a night program was started for the Summer term in 2003.

Forest ranger 
Forest Technology, which includes training in timber cruising & surveying, wood procurement and logging operations, was offered at the college for over 60 years. The first participants received a certificate upon completion of the 12-month program, but graduates in 1970 invested two years to receive an Associate of Science degree in Forest Technology. At the time, LCCC was one of only two, 2-year forestry programs east of the
Mississippi river.
 
Timber Harvesting Technician changed from a certificate program to an AS degree in Forest Engineering Technology in 1974, but was merged into Forest management in 1989. Over half of the instruction was provided in the field, where hands-on experience was emphasized. 
Over the years, technology reduced the number of jobs available in forestry, and by the mid-1990s, there were fewer than 30 students, so the program was scaled back and moved to the Golf Landscape Operations department. Ten years later, enrollment had fallen to just over 20, which did not justify two instructors, so one left and the program was changed back to a one-year certificate in Forest Operations. For several years, class size was in the teens, and the program completion rate was under 50%. 
Following graduation of the class in May, 2010, the Forestry program was discontinued due to lack of interest.

Golf course 
The Associate of Science degree in Golf Course Operations and Landscape Technology programs started in 1967 and throughout the 1970s & 1980s it was one of the most popular vocational programs. 
The three-year curriculum is the only accredited program of its kind in the U.S. and includes two paid summer internships between challenging academic semesters. The program is recognized as one of the finest and graduates have become golf course superintendents at notable facilities throughout the United States.

Nursing 
The nursing program at FGC began in 1964 and is now part of the Allied Health Department which includes a dozen other health career programs. Nursing comprises four programs: 
 Licensed Practical Nurse (LPN), which  runs 11 months
 Registered Nurse (RN), which is a two-year course of study; some students transfer to an upper division school to complete their bachelor's degree in Nursing.
 LPN to RN bridge, which can be completed in 14 months as a full-time student or 12 months in the fast track evening/weekend program.
 Patient Care Assistant, which requires 11 months to complete

To meet the shortage of RNs, a bridge program was created for existing LPNs. However, most working LPNs could not afford to take a year off and return to school. In 2005, the Lake City Medical Center donated $130,000 to fund a new 12-month fast track bridge program. Classes were held two nights a week with clinical experience on Saturdays.

In 2003, the nursing program at FGC was limited to 24 students.
In June, 2008 that number had grown to 60.
In January 2013 the number of students accepted into the Traditional RN Program was increased to 100.

Corrections 
The program for certification of correctional officers began in the early-1970s as a cooperative effort between the college and the Florida Department of Corrections and was offered in both day and evening schedules. The college's five-county district includes over a dozen state incarceration facilities including major prisons, work camps and forestry camps.
LCCC was the first community college in the state to offer an associate degree that bridged the gap between corrections and law enforcement. On February 1, 2008, Dr. Chuck Hall, President of LCCC announced that the correctional officer training program at LCCC would terminate at the end of February, 2008. The Department of Corrections began training staff internally, and the college lost between 450 and 650 students annually.

Student life

Collegiate athletics 
Florida Gateway College resumed athletics in 2017. Women's Volleyball began their first season since 1982 as well as Men's Golf. 2018 Men's Basketball and Women's Cross Country restarted their programs as well. 
Men's Basketball earned back to back Division II, Region 8 Championship Titles in 2019 and 2020.

There are intramurals in Basketball, Flag Football, Ping Pong, Spades Tournament, Billiards, Volleyball, Soccer and Dodgeball. The college had a competitive intercollegiate athletic history for over 45 years but the program was disbanded in 2008.

The men's basketball program was state runners-up in 1968 and state champions in 1970, the year they placed third in the National Junior College tournament in Hutchinson, Kansas. Joe B. Fields was the coach for 22 years, but the sport was discontinued in 1995.

The women's softball team has eight National Junior College Athletic Association titles: 
 Women's Slow Pitch Softball: 1983, 1986, 1987, 1989, 1990, 1992, 1993
 Women's Division I Fast Pitch Softball: 2001

On March 12, 2008,  the college announced that at the end of the 2007–2008 school year, the Lake City Community College intercollegiate athletic program would be disbanded. The proposal was made by college president Charles Hall and endorsed by the college board of trustees. The reasons given were financial, including expected reductions in state funding, lower enrollment, program cutbacks after the Florida Department of Corrections withdrew its training courses, athletic dormitory and food service costs and the prospect of making similar cuts in the next school year. The school joined Edison Community College in Fort Myers, Valencia Community College in Orlando and Florida Keys Community College, near Key West as the only four of Florida's 28 community colleges without an intercollegiate sports program.

Notable people 

 Chuck Brannan, member of the Florida Legislature representing the state's 10th House district.
Carlos Corporán A professional baseball catcher who is currently a free agent. He played in the Major League Baseball (MLB) for the Milwaukee Brewers, Houston Astros, and Texas Rangers. Corporán attended Lake City Community College, where he was converted from a shortstop into a catcher.
Don Newman (basketball) - Former NBA assistant coach of San Antonio Spurs from 2004 to 2012 and Former Head Coach of Arizona State Sun Devils men's basketball. He has won two NBA Championships as a coach and currently Assistant Coach of Washington Wizards.
Perry Warbington - Former NBA draft pick and player for the Philadelphia 76ers,  
Roberto Pérez|Current catcher for the Cleveland Indians of Major League Baseball. Pérez is well remembered for hitting two home runs in game one of the 2016 World Series. He attended Florida Gateway College for two years, Pérez was later drafted by the Cleveland Indians in the 33rd round of the 2008 Major League Baseball Draft.
Heath Phillips - Former Major League Baseball pitcher for the Kansas City Royals
Elizabeth W. Porter - Current member of the Florida House of Representatives
Fain Skinner - NASCAR driver 
Bobby Weed, Golf course designer and builder specializing in design, renovation and repurposing.

References

External links 
 

 

 
Florida College System
Buildings and structures in Columbia County, Florida
Education in Columbia County, Florida
Educational institutions established in 1947
Two-year colleges in the United States
Universities and colleges accredited by the Southern Association of Colleges and Schools
1947 establishments in Florida
Lake City, Florida